Chung may refer to:

Surnames
 Chung (surname)
 Jeong (surname), Korean surname
 Zhong (surname), or Chung, Chinese surname
 Cheung, or Chung, Cantonese surname

Geography
 Chung, Iran, a village in Kohgiluyeh and Boyer-Ahmad Province, Iran
 Chung, India, a village in Patti Tehsil, Amritsar, Punjab, India

Language
 Chung language of Cameroon.

See also
 Chan (disambiguation)
 Chong (disambiguation)
 Zhong (disambiguation)